Björgvinsson may refer to:

Ágúst Björgvinsson (born 1979), Icelandic professional basketball coach
Ágúst Elí Björgvinsson (born 1995), Icelandic handball player
Björgvin Björgvinsson (born 1980), Icelandic Olympic alpine skier
Björgvin Björgvinsson (handballer) (born 1949), Icelandic former Olympic handball player
Sighvatur Kristinn Björgvinsson (born 1942), Icelandic politician and former minister
Svali Björgvinsson (born 1967), Icelandic businessman, sportscaster, former basketball player

See also
Björgvin Hólm